Corpus Christi College (CCC) is a college affiliated with and situated on the campus of University of British Columbia (UBC). The college offers classes in arts, business, and science in small class sizes with close student-faculty interaction.

Corpus Christi offers a liberal arts program that is recognized by UBC, UVic, SFU and other BC public universities as well as private colleges. The college’s dynamic programs allow students to take up to 60 credits in core subjects and electives on their journey toward business, nursing, and other college degree programs. Subjects including English, History, Religious Studies, Communications, Philosophy, Math, and elective studies in Film, Theatre, Digital Media, Anthropology, Classical Studies, Economics, Fine Arts, French, Geography, Political Science, and Psychology, are offered where students may supplement their studies with courses directly at UBC. Students can earn an Associate's of Arts degree and a BA that is recognized by UBC's Faculty of Education.

In June 2000, Corpus Christi received program approval for the University Presidents' Council. The college is an institutional member of the BC Transfer System, where courses are listed in the BC Transfer Guide (www.bctransferguide.ca). In April 2001, Corpus Christi received full accreditation from BC's Private Post-Secondary Education Commission (PPSEC), now the BC Private Career Training Institutions Agency (PCTIA).  Students are eligible for student loans through the BC Student Assistance Plan. CCC is a member of the Association of Catholic Colleges and Universities of Canada (ACCUC), a group that represents Canada's leading Catholic institutions of higher education.

Corpus Christi College's Vancouver campus is located in the University Endowment Lands on Point Grey, which is the name given to the height of land above the point of the same name. Corpus Christi-St. Mark’s is on the traditional, ancestral, and unceded territory of the Musqueam People.  St. Mark's College is the graduate and theological studies institution. The college has a high percentage of students involved in community service and leadership programs. Because of the student services, advising, and smaller classroom sizes, CCC has historically been a popular option for students to transfer to UBC.

See also
 St. Mark's Chapel, Vancouver
 St. Mark's College, Vancouver
 University Endowment Lands
 Regent College
 List of universities in British Columbia
 Higher education in British Columbia

References

Bibliography
 William C. Gibson 'Wesbrook & His University' (Vancouver: University of British Columbia Press)
 George Woodcock & Tim Fitzharris. 'The University of British Columbia – A Souvenir'. (Toronto: Oxford University Press, 1986).

External links

 Corpus Christi College website
 Corpus Christi College Facebook
 The University of British Columbia
 Association of Universities and Colleges of Canada Profile

Universities and colleges in Vancouver
Colleges in British Columbia
University Endowment Lands